Miomantidae is a family of praying mantises in the order Mantodea.

The species are mostly found in western and central Africa and similar in characteristics and behaviour to other mantids.

Taxonomy
The Mantodea Species File lists two subfamilies and seven genera:

Subfamily Miomantinae
 Cilnia Stal, 1876
 Miomantis Saussure, 1870
 Neocilnia Beier, 1930
 Paracilnia Werner, 1909
 Parasphendale Schulthess-Schildler, 1898
 Taumantis Giglio-Tos, 1917

Subfamily Solygiinae 
 Solygia Stal, 1877

References

External links 

.
Mantodea subfamilies